Schistostemon is a genus of flowering plants belonging to the family Humiriaceae.

Its native range is Southern Tropical America.

Species:

Schistostemon auyantepuiensis 
Schistostemon densiflorus 
Schistostemon dichotomus 
Schistostemon fernandezii 
Schistostemon macrophyllus 
Schistostemon oblongifolius 
Schistostemon reticulatus 
Schistostemon retusus 
Schistostemon sylvaticus

References

Humiriaceae
Malpighiales genera